TFN may refer to:

Television
 The Fight Network, an MMA digital cable television channel
 The Football Network, a cable television channel based in Baton Rouge, Louisiana

Internet
 TheForce.Net, a fan-run Star Wars news site
 Tribe Flood Network, a DDoS tool

Other uses
 Tenerife North Airport (Los Rodeos) (IATA airport code)
 Tax file number, issued by the Australian Taxation Office
 The TFN Group, a facility management company based in France
 Toll free number, a telephone number you can call in for free within a certain area
 Transferrin, (biology) the protein product of the TF gene
 Trust for Nature, Victoria, Australia
 Dena'ina language of Alaska (ISO code: tfn)
 Texas Freedom Network, religious freedom and civil liberties group
 The Freecycle Network, a worldwide organisation promoting reuse of goods instead of disposal
 Thornton Fractional North High School, a public school in Calumet City, Illinois
 Transport for the North, styled TfN, a transport agency in the United Kingdom
 Twelve Foot Ninja, a metal band from Melbourne, Australia
 Tsawwassen First Nation, sometimes abbreviated TFN
 Try For New, a South-Korean boy group

See also 
 Thanks for Nothing (disambiguation)